This table displays the top-rated primetime television series of the 1969–70 season as measured by Nielsen Media Research.

References

1969 in American television
1970 in American television
1969-related lists
1970-related lists
Lists of American television series